James Joseph William White (February 8, 1920 – April 5, 1987) was an American football tackle who played five seasons with the New York Giants of the National Football League. He played college football at the University of Notre Dame and attended All Hallows High School in New York, New York.

In his autobiography, NFL Hall of Famer Art Donovan had the following high praise for White: "Little did I think I would eventually become during my high-school years the best defensive lineman to come out of New York City.  And if I do say so myself, I think I became the second-best football player to ever come out of the Bronx.  The best was a guy I played against named Jim White, an end, a tackle, a fullback, an all-everything for All Hallows High School.  He went to Notre Dame.  Then he played for the Giants.  And if he never quite lived up to expectations in the pros, I'd still have to say he was the best goddamn high-school athlete I've ever seen, a tough, dirty sonofabitch.  But good."

References

External links
Just Sports Stats

1920 births
1987 deaths
Players of American football from New Jersey
American football tackles
Notre Dame Fighting Irish football players
New York Giants players
People from Edgewater, New Jersey